Logansport is a town in western DeSoto Parish adjacent to the Sabine River in western Louisiana, United States. The population was 1,340 in 2020. It is part of the Shreveport–Bossier City metropolitan statistical area.

History
The area, long a disputed boundary even after the Louisiana Purchase, was part of a neutral territory negotiated by Gen. James Wilkinson and Lt. Col. Simón de Herrera on 6 November 1806.

The Adams–Onís Treaty of 1819, that was not ratified until 1821, would have been a solution but in 1821 Mexico's independence reignited the dispute. Dr. Logan moved to the area in 1830 began practicing medicine in Louisiana and Texas. He chartered a ferry business in the area and it became known as Logan's Ferry.

Texas won independence in 1836, and the newly formed Republic of Texas agreed to the Adams–Onís Treaty, so the Sabine River became the international boundary. The survey crew began the demarcation process on 20 May 1840, at the Gulf of Mexico, and work was completed in 1841. Boundary markers were placed along the boundary, that included one in Logansport. This marker apparently is the only one surviving, meaning it is the only known international boundary marker in the United States. The Texas Annexation of 1845, ended nine years of the Sabine River international boundary.

The name Logansport was given to the town when a post office was established 28 February 1848. There were few people living in the town prior to the arrival of the railroad. With the arrival of the railroad, there was an influx of gamblers and others of questionable character, along with the citizens of better repute. At one time Logansport had more saloons than grocery stores. The town began to grow and it was incorporated. The first election was held on 25 June 1887. In this election there were only 15 qualified voters listed. Elijah Price was elected mayor, along with five other trustees. Oil and gas were also a very important source of income for the early citizens of Logansport.

Geography
Logansport is located at  (31.974785, −93.997471).

The Logansport riverfront is an entrance off U.S. Highway 84 into Louisiana from Texas. It has a terraced landscape, veterans memorial, walking paths, gazebo, picnic tables, and a pavilion.

Demographics

As of the 2020 United States census, there were 1,340 people, 684 households, and 481 families residing in the town.

Media

Newspaper
The Toledo Bend Tribune, a local newspaper for Logansport closed in 2007. There is currently no local newspaper for the town. There is however a quarterly and popular (online and printed) magazine titled DeSoto Life, that covers all of DeSoto Parish.  Desoto Life is owned and operated by Armstrong Enterprises USA, LLC who also owns iTOUR USA™, and Armstrong Productions.

The Light and Champion, a weekly newspaper across the river in Center, Texas, began distributing a free distribution product called The Merchandiser in March 2017, to stands at several locations in Logansport. The paper's Web site, www.lightandchampion.com, also has a dedicated menu tab for Logansport. The publications are owned by Moser Community Media out of Brenham, Texas.

Government
The mayor of the town is Judge Cordray. The town clerk is Sharon Stewart. The town billing clerk is Terri Hamon. The town's occupational and property tax clerk is Lekia Henderson.

Notable people
 Louis "Moses" Rose, a French Soldier said to be the only man who deserted the defenders of the Alamo, settled in Logansport and is buried there.
 Debbie Pace Silver is a world famous author and speaker on educational strategies for children of different learning styles.
 Glenn Derry (childhood) is Vice President of Special Effects for 21st Century Fox and invented the special effects technology for many Hollywood blockbusters.
 Larry Bagley is the Republican member of the Louisiana House of Representatives for District 7, which includes Logansport.
 Richard "Richie" Burford is a former member of the state House for District 7 and a candidate for the District 38 seat in the Louisiana State Senate in the general election scheduled for 21 November 2015.
 J. Earl Downs, public safety commissioner in Shreveport, 1954 to 1962; educator and coach in Logansport in 1930s
 John Spencer Hardy, a Logansport native and a lieutenant general during World War II, headed the United States Army Air Corps in the Mediterranean Sea. He spent his later years in Shreveport.
 O. E. Price, born in Logansport in 1924, served as a municipal, district, and state appeal court judge from Bossier City
 Elzadie Robinson, a classic female blues singer, was born in Logansport. Music researchers Bob Eagle and Eric S. LeBlanc suggest that she was born Elzadie Wallace in 1897, although 1900 is also possible.
 Country blues musician Ramblin' Thomas was born in Logansport.

References

Towns in DeSoto Parish, Louisiana
Towns in Louisiana
Towns in Shreveport – Bossier City metropolitan area